The United States has continuously sent a representative to Miss World since its inception in 1951. The United States has won the Miss World crown three times in 1973, 1990 and 2010. Currently, Miss World America is the official national pageant that selects the contestant from the United States to Miss World.

History

During the mid 1950s, the Miss Universe organisation sent delegates from the Miss USA system to compete at Miss World (1953–57). Alfred Patricelli of Bridgeport, Connecticut, was the executive director of the Miss World USA during its existence from 1958 to 1977. From 1958 to 1961, the winner of Miss United States competed at Miss World. Then from 1962 to 1966 Alfred Patricelli organized the Miss USA World pageant annually. In 1967, the pageant was renamed Miss World USA and was held every year until 1977. During this time, Miss World USA 1969 Gail Renshaw was the first person to resign from the title of "Miss World USA" after competing in Miss World 1969 in order to get married. Also in 1973, Marjorie Wallace won the Miss World title and became the first American woman to win the Miss World title. Between 1978 through 1980, BBS Productions, Inc., based in New York City, was given the franchise for the Miss World pageant where Griff O'Neil was the organizer, during this time the pageant was named "Miss World America".

From 1981 to 1991, the Miss Universe organization were the license holders, and the American representative to Miss World ended up being the 1st runner-up of the Miss USA pageant. The Miss World Organization however wanted a public announcement during the finals of the Miss USA pageant that the 1st Runner-up would be going to Miss World, but they refused to do so.  Therefore, after 1991 the Miss World Organization did not accept any more Miss USA 1st Runners-up.

From 1992 to 1997, Richard Guy and Rex Holt (GuyRex) were the national directors of Miss World in the United States and organized the Miss World America pageant in 1992, 1993, and 1994. They discontinued the pageant in 1995 but handpicked a representative from 1995 to 1997. In 1998, Hirsh Wilck succeeded GuyRex and became the license holder and sent contestants from 1998 to 2000.

In 2001, the Miss World organization asked Pageantry Magazine to choose a contestant for Miss World 2001 since they did not have a license holder during this year. In 2002, Jean Renard and Miss World Holdings Inc became license holders and handpicked the representative. They dropped the license afterwards due to legal issues with Rebekah Revels, whom they had handpicked to compete in 2002. In 2003, Bruce Vermeulen and Geoff Kearney founded the US Miss World organization. They chose the 2003 representative by mail-in entry and telephone interviews and in 2004 held the US Miss World pageant. In 2005, Barbizon Modeling became the license holders and organized the US Miss World pageant in San Francisco, California.

From 2007 to 2011, Elite Models were the license holders for Miss World in the United States and they handpicked the representative from their list of models. During this time, it was common to know who was going to represent the United States in Miss World a week or two before the international pageant began. Among their designee was Alexandria Mills who in 2010 became one of the few Miss World winners to have won the international pageant without winning a national pageant. In 2012–2013, Lisa-Marie Kohrs, former 2009 U.S. Representative were the national director and she handpicked from the contestants who had the charity background. It is unknown who was in charge of selecting the contestants in 1951, 1952, and 2006. 

In 2014, in an effort from Julia Morley who wanted all national directors to hold a national pageant to select the representative of their country as opposed to only designate, Christopher Wilmer, the organizer of the Miss United States pageant, was appointed as the national director of Miss World in the United States.
As a result, the winner of Miss United States 2014 was selected to compete at Miss World because she met the age requirements of the international pageant. In 2015, Wilmer reinstated the Miss World America pageant in order to properly reflect Miss World's age and contest requirements. Miss World America was held in 2015 and 2016.

In 2017, Lynne Scott Safrit and her daughter Elizabeth Safrit, became co-national directors of Miss World in the United States and created America's Miss World and Miss Teen World America.

In 2018, Michael Blakey became the national director of Miss World in the United States with assistance from Liz Fuller. The pageant went back to being named Miss World America. In 2019, the Miss Teen World America pageant made a return.

Results summary

Placements in Miss World
United States holds a record of 50 placements at Miss World, being placed first overall.

Miss World: Marjorie Wallace (Miss World 1973), Gina Tolleson (Miss World 1990), Alexandria Mills (Miss World 2010)
1st Runners-up: Karin Hultman (1954), Margaret Haywood (1955), Betty Cherry (1956), Dianna Batts (1965), Gail Renshaw (1969), Shree Saini (2021)
2nd Runners-up: Brenda Denton (1985), Nancy Randall (2004), Elizabeth Safrit (2014)
4th Runners-up: Mary Griffin (1953), Judith Achter (1960), Terry Browning (1974), Cindy Miller (1977)
Top 5: Jill Scheffert (1989)
Top 7/8: Jo Ann Odum (1961), Amedee Chabot (1962), Denice Blair (1966), Brucene Smith (1971), Brooke Alexander (1980), Lisa Moss (1981), LuAnn Caughey (1982), Lisa Allred (1983), Kelly Anderson (1984), Halle Berry (1985)
Top 10/11: Diana Magaña (1988), Charlotte Ray (1991), Sharon Belden (1992), Maribeth Brown (1993), Sallie Toussaint (1997), Shauna Gambill (1998), Natasha Allas (1999), Angelique Breaux (2000), Rebekah Revels (2002), Audra Mari (2016)
Top 14/15/16: Michele Metrinko (1963), Jeanne Quinn (1964), Pamela Pall (1967), Sandra Wolsfeld (1970), Lynda Carter (1972), Debra Freeze (1978), Carter Wilson (1979), Abigail McCary (2007), Claudine Book (2012) 
Top 20: Olivia Jordan (2013)
Top 30/40:  Clarissa Bowers (2017), Marisa Butler (2018), Emmy Cuvelier (2019)

Awards
Miss World Americas: Brenda Denton (1985), Gina Tolleson (1990), Sallie Toussaint (1997), Alexandria Mills (2010), Elizabeth Safrit (2014), Audra Mari (2016), Shree Saini (2021)
Miss World Sports: Abigail McCary (2007), Marisa Butler (2018)
Beauty with a Purpose: Shree Saini (2021)
Miss World Multimedia: Elizabeth Safrit (2014)
Miss World Dress Designer: Lane Lindell (2008)
Miss World Beach Beauty: Nancy Randall (2004)
Miss World Talent: Rebekah Revels (2002)
Miss Personality: Cloe Cabrera (1987)

Titleholders 
This is a list of women who have represented the United States at the Miss World pageant:

Color key

Notes:
  † Now deceased

By number of states

Winners' gallery

See also
 Miss America
 Miss USA
 Miss U.S. International
 Miss Earth USA
 Miss Supranational USA
 Miss Grand USA

References

External links
 Miss World Official Website
 Miss World America Official Website
 Miss World United States Official Page
 Miss World History by Julio Rodriguez Matute

American awards

Miss World America